Film university may refer to:

 Film school, an educational institution dedicated to film-making
 Film studies, an academic discipline concerned with the study of films
 Konrad Wolf Film University of Babelsberg in Germany